13 Going on 30 (released as Suddenly 30 in some countries) is a 2004 American fantasy romantic comedy film written by Cathy Yuspa and Josh Goldsmith, directed by Gary Winick, and starring Jennifer Garner about a 13-year-old girl in 1987 who dreams of being popular. During her birthday party, however, she is humiliated by her classmates, and she later wishes that she were 30 years old. Shortly afterward, magic dust makes her awaken at the age of 30 in 2004, and she is uncertain of what happened.

The film received generally positive reviews from critics, with many praising Garner's performance and its nostalgic environment. It was also praised for its humorous plot and self-empowering message. The film was also a commercial success, earning $22 million in its first week and grossing over $6 million, and became one of the year's biggest-selling DVD rental titles. Additionally, the soundtrack charted inside the top 50 on the US Billboard 200 chart. Garner's acting earned her nominations from both the MTV Movie Awards and the Teen Choice Awards.

Plot 
In 1987, the geeky Jenna Rink yearns to be popular, so she persuades the "Six Chicks," the ruling clique led by "Tom-Tom," to attend her 13th birthday party by doing their homework for them. Jenna's best friend and next-door neighbor, Matt "Matty" Flamhaff, who is secretly in love with her, gives her a pink dollhouse that he made himself and sprinkles the roof with "magic wishing dust." The Six Chicks arrive with several boys and trick Jenna into playing "seven minutes in heaven" in her closet while they leave with the completed homework. When Matty discovers what happened, a humiliated Jenna tearfully wishes to be "thirty, flirty, and thriving" as the wishing dust falls on her.

The next morning, Jenna is shocked to find herself in a luxurious Fifth Avenue apartment as an adult in 2004, dating a man that she does not recognize, and with no memory of the intervening 17 years. Upon further investigation, she learns that she now works as an editor for her favorite fashion magazine, Poise, alongside co-editor and best friend, Lucy Wyman, but the magazine is falling behind their rival Sparkle, which her editor-in-chief, Richard Kneeland, believes to be the work of a saboteur. A confused Jenna locates Matty, now a struggling photographer, in Greenwich Village in the hopes of learning what happened, only to discover that she became the new head of the Six Chicks and stopped speaking to him and that Lucy is Tom-Tom.

While delighting in and stumbling through her adult life, she spends time with and advises other teenagers; saves a dull office party by leading the guests, including Matty, in an impromptu "Thriller" line dance; and meets Matty's fiancée, Wendy. However, Jenna gradually learns that her adult self plagiarized ideas, became estranged from her parents, and cheated with a co-worker's husband. Furthermore, she overhears Lucy plotting to remove her from her presentation on a rebrand for Poise. Jenna returns to her childhood home in New Jersey, where she reunites with her parents and reconciles with Matty and hires him to help with her presentation as they gradually fall for each other.

Jenna's presentation proves successful, but Lucy lies to Matty, claiming Jenna chose not to use his photos. While looking for Matty to deliver the good news, Jenna finds Wendy, who reveals that her wedding with Matty is the next day. Moreover, Jenna learns from Kneeland that Lucy became the new editor-in-chief of Sparkle by using Jenna's presentation. Jenna confronts Lucy, who reveals that Jenna was the saboteur, though Lucy took the job first.

Jenna rushes to Matty's childhood home, where the wedding will soon take place, to reveal what happened and to convince him to give their relationship a chance. Matty explains that he already knew of Lucy's deception and has never trusted her since childhood, but too many years have passed. Still caring for Jenna, he gives her the dollhouse, which he kept in spite of everything, and he confesses that he always loved her. A tearful Jenna leaves with the dollhouse as remnants of the wishing dust swirl around her.

She reawakens to find herself back in 1987 on her 13th birthday. When Matty finds her in the closet, she embraces and kisses him. Realizing that Lucy is not a true friend, she destroys the homework that she worked on for the Six Chicks and eventually goes on to become happily married to Matty and move into a suburban house that resembles the dollhouse.

Cast
 Jennifer Garner as Jenna Rink
 Christa B. Allen as young Jenna Rink
 Mark Ruffalo as Matt Flamhaff
Sean Marquette as young Matt Flamhaff
 Judy Greer as Lucy "Tom-Tom" Wyman
 Alexandra Kyle as young Lucy Wyman
 Andy Serkis as Richard Kneeland
 Kathy Baker as Beverly Rink
 Phil Reeves as Wayne Rink
 Lynn Collins as Wendy
 Susan Egan as Tracy Hansen
 Samuel Ball as Alex Carlson
 Marcia DeBonis as Arlene
 Kiersten Warren as Trish Sackett
 Ashley Benson as Six Chick
 Brittany Curran as Six Chick
 Brie Larson as Six Chick
 Megan Lusk as Six Chick
 Julia Roth as Six Chick
 Renee Olstead as Becky
 Gia Mantegna as Gina
 Alex Black as Chris Grandy

Production

In October 2002, director Gary Winick was in negotiations to direct 13 Going on 30. It was also announced that Susan Arnold and Donna Arkoff Roth were producing the project with the writers' manager, Gina Matthews. Actress Jennifer Garner was cast for the movie's lead role. In order to film the picture, Garner shot it while on break from filming her television series Alias. Gwyneth Paltrow, Hilary Swank, and Renée Zellweger were all considered for the lead role. Judy Greer was cast to play Lucy, Garner's best friend; Kathy Baker and Phil Reeves were cast as Garner's mother and father, respectively. Later, Andy Serkis was selected to play Garner's boss; while Samuel Ball was announced as Garner's boyfriend.

On May 13, 2003, it was reported that filming for the movie was underway in Los Angeles with Revolution Studios. It was filmed in Los Angeles, New York City, and South Pasadena, California. Interior shots were filmed in Los Angeles. The crew moved to New York City, where they shot exteriors for 17 days. Principal photography took place from May to November 2003. Written by Josh Goldsmith and Cathy Yuspa, the script was "polished" by Niels Mueller (who lost an initial writing credit in a subsequent dispute arbitrated by the Writers Guild of America).

Christa B. Allen, who portrayed 13-year-old Jenna, later "reprised" her role as a younger version of Jennifer Garner by portraying the teenaged version of Jenny Perotti in Ghosts of Girlfriends Past. In October 2016, it was announced 13 Going on 30 was going to be adapted for Broadway with an estimated debut in late 2017, but plans did not move forward.

Music

Soundtrack

The soundtrack to 13 Going on 30 was released on April 20, 2004, from Hollywood Records. The album mostly contains music from the 1980s with a range of hits from famous recording artists such as Talking Heads, Billy Joel, Madonna, Pat Benatar and Whitney Houston. There is also a handful of songs performed by contemporary artists, such as Lillix and Liz Phair. It was released on April 20, 2004, by Hollywood Records.

 "Head Over Heels" – The Go-Go's
 "Jessie's Girl" – Rick Springfield
 "What the World Needs Now Is Love" — Jackie DeShannon
 "Burning Down The House" – Talking Heads
 "Mad About You" – Belinda Carlisle
 "I Wanna Dance With Somebody (Who Loves Me)" – Whitney Houston
 "What I Like About You" – Lillix
 "Heaven Is a Place on Earth" — Belinda Carlisle
 "Ice Ice Baby" – Vanilla Ice
 "Crazy for You" – Madonna
 "Vienna" – Billy Joel
 "Why Can't I?" – Liz Phair
 "Nothing Compares 2 U" — Sinéad O'Connor
 "Tainted Love" – Soft Cell
 "Love Is a Battlefield" – Pat Benatar
 "Will I Ever Make It Home" – Ingram Hill

Other songs featured in the film
 "Thriller" – Michael Jackson
 "Everybody Have Fun Tonight" – Wang Chung
 "Good Day" – Luce

The songs "Breathe" by Michelle Branch and "Iris" by the Goo Goo Dolls were featured in promotional trailers, but were not featured in the movie or on the soundtrack.

Original score

 "Prologue" (4:19)
 "Jenna Dream House" (1:13)
 "Transformation" (0:31)
 "Wake Up" (2:03)
 "Naked Guy" (0:36)
 "Off to Work" (0:29)
 "Poise" (0:43)
 "Paper Throw" (0:28)
 "Can I Go?" (1:05)
 "Matt's Apt" (0:46)
 "Fluffy Pillow" (0:49)
 "Au Revoir" (0:44)
 "Good Luck With Fractions" (0:35)
 "Mean Messages" (0:25)
 "Eavesdropping" (0:46)
 "Yearbook Idea" (1:14)
 "Elevator" (0:25)
 "Swings" (01:49)
 "Assemble the Proposal" (0:39)
 "Hang in There" (0:38)
 "Angry Lucy" (0:15)
 "Presentation" (2:30)
 "Sneaking" (0:59)
 "Rain Montage" (1:08)
 "Getting Married Tomorrow" (0:29)
 "Sparkle Bus Overlay" (0:39)
 "Dream House Revisited" (1:28)
 "30 to 13" (0:38)
 "Crazy for You Overlay" (1:09)

Reception

Box office
The film opened on April 23, 2004, with an initial box office take of $22 million in its first weekend, debuting at number two, almost tied with Denzel Washington's thriller Man on Fire. In its second week, it dropped to number three, earning $9 million. In its third week, it fell to number five, earning $5.5 million. In its fourth week, it took sixth place with an estimated $4.2 million. In its fifth week, it fell to number seven, with an estimated $2.5 million. In its sixth week, the film fell to number 9, earning $1 million. It ended with $57 million at the domestic box office, and at total worldwide gross of $96,455,697.

Critical response
On Rotten Tomatoes the film has an approval rating of 65% based on reviews from 179 critics, with an average rating of 6.20/10. The site's critics consensus reads, "Although the plot leaves a lot to be desired, 13 Going on 30 will tug at your inner teenager's heartstrings thanks in large part to a dazzling performance from Jennifer Garner." On Metacritic the film has a score of 57% based on reviews from 35 critics, indicating "Mixed or average reviews". Audiences surveyed by CinemaScore gave the film a grade A−, on a scale of A to F.

Owen Gleiberman of Entertainment Weekly gave the film a very positive review with a grade of "A−", writing "13 Going on 30 is the rare commercial comedy that leaves you entranced by what can happen only in the movies." Gleiberman also praised Jennifer Garner's performance, writing: "She cuts out all traces of adult consciousness, of irony and flirtation and manipulation, reducing herself to a keen, goggle-eyed earnestness that's utterly beguiling." Mick LaSalle of the San Francisco Chronicle wrote: "The possibilities of Jenna's confusion are exploited for full comic effect. Garner, who turns out to be a charming, abandoned comedian, makes Jenna's incredulousness and innocence very funny and occasionally even touching." Joe Leydon of Variety also praised her performance, writing "Garner throws herself so fully and effectively into the role that in a few key scenes, she vividly conveys Jenna's high spirits and giddy pleasure through the graceful curling of her toes." Leydon praised director Gary Winick for "bringing a fresh spin to most of the script's clichés and emphasizing nuggets of emotional truth provided by Goldsmith and Yuspa." Wesley Morris of The Boston Globe wrote that "The movie is tailor-made for women who openly lust for dream houses, dream jobs, and dream hubbies." He also wrote that "the best stuff involves the childhood preamble. (The young actors playing Jenna, Matt, and Lucy are terrific.) Those moments feel painfully, comically true."

Claudia Puig of USA Today gave the film 3 out of 4 stars, commenting, "This romantic comedy is intended as a cautionary fairy tale. The silly humor works with the movie's gentle message of self-empowerment and avoids sappiness in a tender interlude where the adult Jenna returns to her childhood home. Amusing, charming and pleasantly nostalgic, 13 Going on 30 should fall easily onto moviegoers' wish lists." Mick Martin and Marsha Porter's 2005 DVD and Video Guide called it a "shameless rip-off of the Tom Hanks' classic Big", adding that it was "weak, but predictable and is sparked by the excellent performance of Jennifer Garner".

Elvis Mitchell of The New York Times wrote: "The performances give the movie more flavor and life than the situation does; it often feels like prechewed Bubble Yum. The message of the plot is that a lack of sophistication is the key to success, even at a fashion magazine that attracts readers through sexy exhibitionism. The movie would have shown some daring savvy if it had played more with the role-playing aspect of fashion spreads. Instead, it is content to eat its retro snack cake and have it, too." Roger Ebert of the Chicago Sun-Times gave it 2 out of 4 and wrote: "You buy the magic because it comes with the territory. What I couldn't buy was the world of the magazine office, and the awkward scenes in which high-powered professionals don't seem to notice that they're dealing with a 13-year-old mind." Andrea Gronvall of the Chicago Reader wrote that "The formula works, thanks in large part to star Jennifer Garner, who's so radiant theaters should be stocking sunblock. Underlying the shenanigans and the pop-psychology moral—self-love is a prerequisite for true love—there's a touching wistfulness about roads not taken." Jorge Morales of The Village Voice commented: "The thirtysomething in me was all, gag me with a spoon, but the kid in me was like, this movie's rad to the max."

Accolades
The filmed received several nominations at the Teen Choice Awards, including a nomination for Garner. The musical performance of Garner and Ruffalo was nominated for an MTV Movie Award.

Home media
The film became one of the five biggest DVD rentals of the year. The DVD was re-released in 2006 with the subtitle The Fun and Flirty Edition with special packaging and different special features.  The Blu-ray version of 13 Going on 30 was released on January 20, 2009.

References

External links

 
 
 
 
 

2000s American films
2000s coming-of-age comedy films
2000s English-language films
2000s fantasy comedy films
2000s romantic fantasy films
2000s teen comedy films
2000s teen fantasy films
2000s teen romance films
2004 films
2004 fantasy films
2004 romantic comedy films
American coming-of-age comedy films
American fantasy comedy films
American romantic comedy films
American romantic fantasy films
American teen comedy films
American teen romance films
Body swapping in films
Columbia Pictures films
Coming-of-age romance films
Films about rapid human age change
Films about time travel
Films about wish fulfillment
Films directed by Gary Winick
Films scored by Theodore Shapiro
Films set in 1987
Films set in 2004
Films set in New Jersey
Films set in New York City
Films shot in Los Angeles
Films shot in Los Angeles County, California 
Films shot in New York City
Middle school films
Revolution Studios films
Works about fashion magazine publishing